A sock is a piece of clothing worn on the foot.

Sock(s) may also refer to:

People 
 Jack Sock (born 1992), an American tennis player
 Wilfried Sock (born 1944), an East German former ice hockey player
 Socks Seibold (1896-1965), a Major League Baseball pitcher
 Socks Seybold (1870-1921), a Major League Baseball outfielder
 Socks Byrne, a common name of Irish boxer Tony Byrne (born 1930)
 Bert "Sock" Wysocki, a fictional character in the television series Reaper

Arts and entertainment 
 Sock!, a 1965 album by saxophonist Gene Ammons
 Socks (novel), a 1973 children's novel about a cat named Socks Bricker by Beverly Cleary
 Sock, a 2004 novel by Penn Jillette

Other uses 
 SOCKS, an Internet protocol
 Sockpuppet (Internet), or sock–a deceptive identity
 Sock (anatomy), the lower part of a horse's foot and specifically its color
 Sock, a symbol of comedy in ancient Greek theatre; see Sock and buskin
 Socks (cat), a household pet of Bill Clinton
 Socks (Blue Peter cat), a Blue Peter cat
 Socks Glacier, in Ross Dependency of Antarctica
 The Sock, a statue in Loughborough, United Kingdom

See also
 Sox (disambiguation)